Olivieri is a surname of Italian and Corsican origins. The name refers to:

 Aldo Olivieri (1910–2001), Italian football player
 Andrew Olivieri (b. 1981), Canadian football  player
 Annibale degli Abati Olivieri, Italian aristocrat, writer & amateur archeologist who founded the Biblioteca Oliveriana in Pesaro
 Chiara Olivieri (born 1979), Italian curler
 Dawn Olivieri (contemporary), actress and model
 Dennis Olivieri (born 1947), American former actor and singer known professionally in his early years as Dennis Joel
 Harry Olivieri (1916–2006), Italian-American restaurateur; co-inventor of the Philly cheesesteak
 Nancy Olivieri (b. 1953/54), Canadian hematologist and researcher
 Nikola Olivieri (born 1987), Italian football player
 Pat Olivieri (b. unknown, d. 1974), Italian-American restaurateur; co-inventor of the Philly cheesesteak
 Renato Olivieri (1925–2013), Italian novelist

See also
 Olivier (surname)
 Vieri (surname)
 Vieira

Italian-language surnames